A Christian video game is an aspect of Christian media for video games, this video game genre focuses on the narrative and themes of Christian morals and Christianity. The term can also refer to Christian symbolism, mythology, media franchises, and Christian media organizations within video game culture and industry.

Game design 
These games usually emphasize the teachings of the ministry of Jesus, or retell Bible stories such as Noah's Ark or the life of Jesus. While Christian video games are considered a genre, they usually intersect with other genres, such as early computer title Bible Computer Games which is an educational game, action-adventure games Spiritual Warfare and Super 3D Noah's Ark, the Guitar Praise series of rhythm games, or the simulation video game I am Jesus Christ. They are usually developed to appeal to Christian audiences.

Many of the earliest Christian video games were written by the company BibleBytes in 1982 for the TRS-80 Color Computer. That year, the company released eleven games for the computer, including such titles as Manna from Heaven, Moses' Rod, and Noah's Ark. These games were compiled together and released under the name Bible Computer Games. Several Christian-themed computer programming books, based on the original BibleBytes Bible Computer Games source code, were written by John and Joyce Conrod in 1984. The Conrods were the primary authors of the first two books while their son, Phil Conrod, was one of the original game developers and served as technical editor. The first BASIC programming book, "Computer Bible Games", included the BASIC source code for the Timex/Sinclair, Radio Shack TRS-80 Color Computer, and Texas Instruments TI-99 computer systems. The book included tips for adapting the programs for the Apple II, Atari 8-bit family, VIC-20, Commodore 64, and TRS-80 Since then, PC Enterprises and BibleByte Books has published several "Computer Bible Games" programming books for Microsoft Small Basic, Visual Basic, Visual C# and Java. Another Christian video game pioneer was Bernard K. Bangley, who wrote Bible BASIC: Bible Games for Personal Computers with his son, David Bangley. Bible BASIC was published by Harper & Row in December, 1983. His book included type-in BASIC programs to create Bible games. All of these Bible themed programming books were designed for Christian schools.

The annual Christian Game Developers Conference (CGDC) was started in 2001 by Tim Emmerich, founder of the small independent studio GraceWorks Interactive. The conference has been described as a place for Christian game developers to gather, make deals with other Christian developers, and gain encouragement from developers with a shared faith.

Game Developer, affiliated with the Game Developers Conference, featured an article by Greg Campbell titled "How to Handle Christianity in Video Games" in 2018. The article covered historical depictions of Christianity in video games, and suggested how developers can incorporate Christianity into their Christian game design.

Production
While other Christian media formats such as music, literature, and film have big budget record labels, publishers, and blockbusters, the Christian video game industry has primarily been led by indie games and is generally devoid of AAA developers. This has led to criticism related to quality control concerns.

Many major publishers and studios are highly diversified, with brands under their moniker with both Christian media and video game culture. This would include mass media Warner Bros. Discovery which owns Warner Bros. Interactive Entertainment, Rooster Teeth and distributes the independent record label Word Entertainment, major media conglomerates like NBCUniversal which is parent company of both Big Idea Entertainment and G4 Media, or even indie media franchise production studios such as Heaven Sent Gaming. While companies like G4 are not Christian media outlets, NBCUniversal operates both VeggieTales Christian studio Big Idea Entertainment and G4 Media, formerly the G4 TV network, as in-name only production units. Similarly Warner Bros. Discovery operates their interactive and Rooster Teeth studios separately from the distribution of Word Entertainment.

History

1980s–1990s 
Some of the early Christian video games are sought after by computer museums, particularly video game museums and private video game collections. This is due to them being distributed in small numbers at hobbyist conventions or at Christian bookstores and magazines, instead of high-volume video game retailers. One such example is the 1983 Atari 2600 game Red Sea Crossing, of which only two copies are known to have appeared on the resale market, one of which sold for over $10,000 in 2013. Another such Atari 2600 game was the 1982 The Music Machine, which sold for over $5,000 in 2017.

The 1980s also saw the earliest video game adaptions of Middle-earth. These include The Hobbit (1982), Lord of the Rings: Game One (1985), Shadows of Mordor (1987), and War in Middle Earth (1988). Narnia saw game adaptions in the form of Adventures in Narnia and Adventures in Narnia: Dawn Treader. None of these Middle-earth and Narnia games released on the NES, probably due to Nintendo of America's strict guidelines against religious content at the time.

The Nintendo Entertainment System featured numerous Christian video games, though Nintendo of America's corporate stance at the time was that religious symbolism was forbidden. Nevertheless, even officially developed Nintendo of Japan products sometimes featured Christian symbols; for example, The Legend of Zelda featured a Christian cross on Link's shield. One of the first NES games to use overt Christian symbolism was Castlevania, a game which followed a Christian vampire hunter named Simon Belmont who carried weaponry such as holy water, crosses that function as boomerangs, and a blue rosary which cleared all on-screen enemies. Konami released a game based on Noah's Ark in Japan and Europe, but was never released in the United States, due to the aforementioned reluctance of Nintendo of America towards religious content. Nintendo of America's viewpoint on religious content at the time has been criticized, it even caused the censorship and modification of small-scale Christian iconography including 1989's DuckTales and Castlevania III: Dracula's Curse. Starting in the late 1980s, the unlicensed game developer Wisdom Tree developed a number of specifically Christian video games for the NES, such as Spiritual Warfare. As time went on Nintendo of America reversed their stance on religious material, now even overtly Christian games release on Nintendo platforms, just as Nintendo of Japan had always allowed.

The Castlevania franchise would inspire later demon hunter centric video game titles throughout the years, especially due to the popularity of its Simon Belmont and Alucard characters. Also in the 1980s, Ryu Hayabusa from the Ninja Gaiden series is another example of a video game demon hunter. The Doom series, started in 1990s, follows a demon slayer named Doomguy.

J.R.R. Tolkien's The Lord of the Rings, Vol. I was released in 1994 on Super Nintendo by Interplay Entertainment, this marked the only official appearance of Middle-earth on the SNES. In 1994, Wisdom Tree licensed the id Software Wolfenstein 3D engine for the SNES game Super 3D Noah's Ark. The game has been reprinted and rereleased a number of times since.

Christian video games, like other forms of Christian media, have been referenced in popular culture. In the season 11 episode  "Alone Again, Natura-Diddily" of The Simpsons, Bart Simpson plays one of the games owned by Todd and Rod Flanders named "Billy Graham's Bible Blaster" where the aim is to convert non-Christians to Christianity by using a gun that shoots Bibles.

2000s–present 
During the 2000s, the first-person shooter game Catechumen was released by N'Lightning Software Development, which had a spiritual successor titled Ominous Horizons: A Paladin's Calling. Riddle of the Sphinx: An Egyptian Adventure, an adventure game developed by Omni Creative Group and released in late 2000, has a featureless protagonist look up cryptic clues in audiocassette tapes combined with three verses from the Bible's Book of Numbers, which gives out the combination number from a padlock needed to open a chest and get a scroll and its translation page; at the end of the game, the protagonist learns about the Ark of the Covenant and what happened to it in ancient times. The annual Christian Game Developers Conference (CGDC) was started in 2001.

In 2005, The Bible Game by Mass Media Games was released for the Game Boy Advance, PlayStation 2, and Xbox. That same year, the first version of Dance Praise was released by Digital Praise for PC. Emo's MatchMaker, a puzzle video game developed by Omni Creative Group and published by Big Fish Games for Microsoft Windows in early 2007, gives Biblical related advice to husbands and/or wives.

The 2000s also saw the first adaptations of Christian media franchises for major video game platforms. Those include games based on The Lord of the Rings and The Chronicles of Narnia film series, including The Lord of the Rings: The Two Towers (2002), The Lord of the Rings: The Return of the King (2003), The Chronicles of Narnia: The Lion, the Witch and the Wardrobe (2005), and The Chronicles of Narnia: Prince Caspian (2008), as well as the VeggieTales franchise in the form of LarryBoy and the Bad Apple (2006) for the Game Boy Advance and PlayStation 2. In 2006, Left Behind: Eternal Forces, a real-time strategy game, was released by Inspired Media Entertainment based on Left Behind series of novels; it had sequels released in 2007, 2010, and 2011. 

The demon hunter series Devil May Cry follows Dante, the series alludes to classic Christian novel Dante's Divine Comedy, and the Diablo series has a demon hunter build. The Bayonetta, Drakengard, and Dark Souls franchises did a spin on the concepts from Devil May Cry and Diablo. Other games to feature demon hunters from the 2000s–2010s were fighting game series Soulcalibur has a demon hunter character named Taki, and the second installment of the series had comic book hero Spawn as a playable character in the Xbox version. In the Senran Kagura franchise, Homura's Crimson Squad are demon hunter like characters. The Monster Hunter series is primarily inspired by tales of dragonslayers and the demon hunter manga Berserk.

During the Nintendo Fusion Tour, a concert tour which ran from 2003-2006, contemporary Christian music band Relient K was featured in 2006. CCM music has appeared in the soundtrack of several video games, including  Relient K's "College Kids" in MX Unleashed, Third Day's "This Is Who I Am" in NASCAR 09, Skillet's "Hero" and "Monster" in WWE SmackDown vs. Raw 2010, and Lecrae's "Where We Come From” and "This is My Time" in Spider-Man: Miles Morales.

The Adam's Venture games, first released in 2009, have made appearances on PlayStation 3, PlayStation 4, Xbox One, and Nintendo Switch.

The 1980s Christian anime Superbook, rebooted in 2011 as a computer animated series, has had educational video game adaptations from 2014 and onward for browsers and mobile devices.  

Following success of the Duck Dynasty reality television show, the Cabela's game developer Fun Labs made a Duck Dynasty video game for PC, Xbox 360, PlayStation 3, PlayStation 4, and Xbox One. A separate Nintendo 3DS version was made by licensed developer Black Lantern Studios. These games were published in 2014 by Activision. 2014 was also the year that Monolith Productions released Middle-earth: Shadow of Mordor, and in 2017 this was followed up with Middle-earth: Shadow of War.

The 2014 game That Dragon, Cancer was critically acclaimed as an example of video games as an art form; the game touches on the concepts of love, mortality, and faith. The game involves couple Ryan and Amy Green raising their son Joel, who had been diagnosed with cancer, and the experience was the subject of the documentary film Thank You for Playing.

Five Nights at Freddy's is a survival horror franchise which started in 2014, created by independent Christian developer Scott Cawthon. Initially, he created cartoons and simpler video game titles, including an animated adaption of The Pilgrim's Progress, and the construction and management simulation game Chipper & Sons Lumber. These were not well-received, and were referred to as unintentionally "unsettling" and "terrifying". This inspired Cawthon to make something intentionally scary.

Steam has allowed indie games to reach a wider audience. The Wisdom Tree games Super 3D Noah's Ark and Spiritual Warfare were ported to the service by Piko Interactive in 2015 and 2017, and the role-playing simulation title I Am Jesus Christ launched in 2019, that same year Shepherd of Light was released by John Paul the Great Catholic University, and in 2021 action-adventure game John Christian and the turn-based RPG Paladin Dream were released.

The Red Dead series features a Western plotline that focuses on redemption, particularly its 2010 and 2018 titles Red Dead Redemption and Red Dead Redemption 2. The 2018 video game Dead Cells had a 2023 DLC titled Return to Castlevania, which had a level and characters inspired by Castlevania: Symphony of the Night; the DLC maintained the Castlevania franchise's hallmark Christian symbolism and demon hunting. Elden Ring, by FromSoftware and Bandai Namco Entertainment and written by Hidetaka Miyazaki and George R. R. Martin, contained influences from traditional fantasy and Christian mythology. The Lord of the Rings: Gollum is an upcoming Middle-Earth game in development by Daedalic Entertainment, set for release on most major platforms in 2023.

Christian video game journalism
Christian video game journalism is common for Christian news and media outlets. Some churches are known to incorporate game journalism into their services, which former theology student turned video game journalist Andy Robertson did with an interactive sermon involving the game Abzû.

In 1984, then-editor and president of Christianity Today V. Gilbert Beers and his son Ronald A. Beers worked for Baker Book House and co-authored Bible stories for children in the form of the Baker Street Kids franchise, which consists of the titular gang of children who dress up for a Sunday school play and reenact stories from the Bible. The books were adapted into educational computer games in which religious youth must answer questions about Bible stories correctly before they get treated to a little light animation; the games were distributed by Baker Book House, developed by Brian A. Rice Inc., and published by Educational Publishing Concepts for Apple II and Commodore 64. Series 1 (Early Heroes of the Bible, Searching for a King, The Boy Jesus, and The Early Church) was released in 1984, and Series 2 (Moses and the Wilderness Wanderings, A Week That Changed the World, Paul's Missionary Journeys, and Israel's Golden Years) was released in 1985-86.

Major Christian news outlets Christianity Today, Christian Broadcasting Network, Relevant, and Trinity Broadcasting Network, often include video game journalism as a part of their coverage. And some outlets specialize in video game culture including Christ Centered Gamer and Geeks Under Grace, journalists at these outlets often work for other outlets as well.

See also 
 List of Christian video games

References

External links 
 Christian Game Programming Resource
 Christian Game Developers Conference
 Christian Game Design Resource

 
Video game types
Video game genres